The Ansel Adams Award is an annual award given by The Wilderness Society of the United States.  Named by American photographer and environmentalist Ansel Adams, the award is given to a current or former federal official who has been a fervent advocate of conservation.

Recipients
Source: Wilderness Society
2016 Dianne Feinstein
2015 John Podesta
2014 Max Baucus
2013 Ken Salazar
2012 Not awarded
2011 Bruce Babbitt 
2010 Mike Dombeck (US Forest Service)
2009 Jeff Bingaman
2008 Norman D. Dicks
2007 James M. Jeffords ;  Sherwood L. Boehlert 
2006 Maria Cantwell
2005 Ernest F. Hollings
2004 Nick J. Rahall II ; Harry Reid
2002 John Kerry and Joseph Lieberman 
2001 John Lewis
2000 David Obey and John Porter
1999 Kathleen A. McGinty 
1998 Dale Bumpers
1997 Albert Gore, Jr.
1994 Bruce F. Vento
1993 Not awarded
1991 George Miller
1990 Gaylord Nelson
1989 William V. Roth, Jr. ; Allan Cranston
1988 John H. Chafee
1987 Sidney Yates
1986 Stewart L. Udall
1985 Cecil D. Andrus
1984 Morris K. Udall
1983 Phillip Burton
1982 John F. Seiberling
1981 Jimmy Carter
1980 Ansel Adams

See also
List of environmental awards
List of prizes named after people

References

Environmental awards
Nature conservation in the United States
American awards
Awards established in 1980
Ansel Adams